ADIVIMA (The Association for the Integral Development of the Victims of the Violence of the Verapaces, Maya Achí) is a non-profit human rights organization in Guatemala that works to find solutions to the social, economic, political, cultural, and educational problems that resulted from the Guatemalan Civil War.  The organization is based in Rabinal, Baja Verapaz, and concentrates its work in the surrounding communities that were some of those most affected by the violence of the internal conflict.

History
ADIVIMA was officially formed in 1994 when three survivors of the Rio Negro Massacre – Carlos Chen, Jesus Tecu Osorio and Pedrina Burrero Lopez – expanded their community group for orphans, widows, widowers, displaced persons and survivors of the internal conflict to form an official organization. The initial project of ADIVIMA was to work to get exhumations from the Rio Negro massacres and prosecute those responsible for the human rights violations. Jesus Tecu Osorio was essential in leading this project, and through his efforts and those of ADIVIMA, some of the mass graves of the Rio Negro massacre were exhumed and nine of those responsible were prosecuted and convicted. In 1996, Jesus Tecu Osorio won the Reebok Human Rights Award for his work in the case.

Organizational structure
ADIVIMA's work to assist survivors falls into three main categories: Human rights, socioeconomic development, and community organization.

Human rights legal support
During the past 13 years ADIVIMA has accompanied and supported survivors in many different human rights legal cases that the victims of the internal conflict have brought against the government. These include the cases of the numerous massacres and acts of genocide that occurred in the Maya Achí communities due to the active participation and action of the Guatemalan National Army and Civil Defense Patrol (PAC) squads as a part of the strategies of the governments of Lucas García, Benedicto Lucas y Efraín Ríos Montt.

The legal and penal processes of the cases in which ADIVIMA has accompanied have lasted more than thirteen years with some positive results, although there are many difficulties that exist that do not allow the goals and objectives of these cases to be completely met. Some of these difficulties include the use of resources by the defense teams to prolong trials and outlast the lesser resources of ADIVIMA, as well as the delay of the release of legal resolutions by the Constitutional Court, which can take up to two years.

In the case of the massacre that occurred in community of Río Negro on March 13, 1982, which killed 107 children and 70 women, the work of ADIVIMA, along with other individuals and organizations, has sent to prison nine PAC members responsible for the massacres, three of whom were sentenced to 50 years in prison. In 2006, during a public forum, an order was issued to capture three more PAC members responsible for the massacres.  Although the motion was presented before the Inter-American Commission on Human Rights, the state has shown little will to capture or punish the three PAC patrol men.  The case against the military detachment responsible in this situation is another circumstance that qualifies under this paradigm. They have also been denounced by ADIVIMA before the Public Minister for their crimes against humanity.

Legal and psychosocial accompaniment to exhumations
Undertaking exhumations is a lengthy and complex process that can last anywhere from several months to several years. ADIVIMA works to facilitate and coordinate this process so as to make it as simple as possible for the families of the victims. This process involves identifying sites of clandestine mass graves, gathering testimony from eyewitness survivors, planning traditional Mayan ceremonies before the exhumations, coordinating the efforts of the forensic anthropologists at the FAFG to exhume the graves, creating a petition from information from the forensic anthropologists, presenting the cases before the Public Ministry, and coordinating proper funerals and burial ceremonies with families of the victims.
This long process is important in the documentation of the events that occurred during the internal conflict as well as to allow the families of the victims to bury the deceased in legal cemeteries. ADIVIMA has worked on more than 250 investigations and denunciations of clandestine cemeteries in Baja Verapaz and more than 25 in Alta Verapaz. ADIVIMA has provided legal accompaniment in 59 of the exhumations executed in Baja Verapaz and 6 in Alta Verapaz.  In 2006 alone, ADIVIMA provided accompaniment and support in more than 14 exhumations of clandestine graves.

Socioeconomic development
Part of ADIVIMA's work focuses on the socioeconomic development of the survivors of the massacres in the areas surrounding Rabinal. Their main project is a rotating microcredit program to help provide small funds for survivors to have the opportunities to become small entrepreneurs to supplement their incomes.  ADIVIMA is currently in the process of developing a scholarship program for young girls from communities affected by the internal conflict to be able to pursue an education.  These awards will cover tuition, room and board, transportation, and health expenses for those selected to enter the program.

Community organization
ADIVIMA works with leaders from the surrounding rural communities to encourage participation in local and national government.  ADIVIMA sponsors workshops to train male, female, and youth community leaders in how to affectively assert their rights and work with the larger government structure.

Rio Negro massacre reparations
While some individuals that were responsible for some of the Rio Negro massacres that killed over 440 people have been sent to prison, the survivors affected by the building of the Chixoy Dam have never been fully justly compensated for their losses. ADIVIMA is one of the participating organizations in the COCAHICH (Coordinating Committee of Communities Affected by the Construction of the Chixoy Dam), which is a committee of indigenous Maya Achí communities that are fighting for reparations in the Rio Negro Massacre case.  An official report by the Center for Political Ecology, which was peer reviewed by both the American Association for the Advancement of Science and the American Anthropological Association, found that the creation of the dam caused social, cultural, and economic damage to the affected communities and was in violation of international law. COCAHICH holds the Guatemalan government, the National Institute of Electricity (INDE), the World Bank, and the Inter-American Development Bank responsible for the massacres and to make reparations to those affected by the construction of the dam.

In 2004, ADIVIMA, as a member of COCAHICH, participated in a peaceful protest of more than 2000 people from the affected communities at the site of the dam in order to petition for the creation of a Damages Verification Committee to analyze the damages and possible reparations in regards to the construction of the Chixoy Dam. The next day authorities met with the protesters and signed an official document for the creation of a Damages Verification Committee. After the protest, the INDE filed a formal complaint to the Public Prosecutor’s Office stating that the leaders of the protest were charged with threatening the internal security of the nation, causing bodily harm, and making threats against the INDE. Warrants for the arrest of COCAHICH leaders were issued, and among them were ADIVIMA founder Carlos Chen Osorio and executive director Juan de Dios Garcia.[4] All but of the charges were later dropped after lawyers from the Environmental Defender Law Center in the United States intervened, but experts consider this move by the INDE to be an attempt to intimidate those working to obtain reparations.[5]  The Damages Verifications Committee was finally convened for the first time in December 2005. The World Bank has accepted the invitation of the commission to join, and the Inter-American Development Bank is considering the offer.  While the process has finally begun, still more than twenty years after the massacres no one has been compensated for their losses.  ADIVIMA, along with other organizations is continuing to work for reparations for those affected by the creation of the Chixoy Dam.

References

External links
 
ADIVIMA (archived)

Human rights organizations based in Guatemala